The 2014–15 Arouca season was the club's 62nd competitive season, 2nd in the Primeira Liga, and 63rd year in existence as a football club. 

Along with the club's participation in the Primeira Liga, the club also competed in the Taça de Portugal and Taça da Liga. The club finished 16th in the Primeira Liga, finishing five points above the relegation zone. In the Taça de Portugal, the club were eliminated in the third round by Vitória de Setúbal. Like in the Taça de Portugal, the Arouquenses were eliminated in the third round of the Taça da Liga. Arouca finished third in a group consisting of Benfica, Moreirense and Nacional.

Club
Coaching staff
{|class="wikitable"
|-
!Position
!Staff
|-
|Manager|| Pedro Emanuel
|-
|Assistant Manager|| Jorge Leitão
|-
|Goalkeeper Coach|| Luís Miguel
|-
|Fitness Coach|| João Brandão
|-
|Physio|| André Barbosa
|-
|Scout|| Virgílio Fernandes
|-Other information

First-team squad
Stats as of the end of the 2014–15 season. Games played and goals scored only refers to appearances and goals in domestic league campaigns.

Competitions

Legend

Overall

Competition record

Primeira Liga

References

F.C. Arouca seasons
Arouca